In numerical analysis, the shooting method is a method for solving a boundary value problem by reducing it to an initial value problem. It involves finding solutions to the initial value problem for different initial conditions until one finds the solution that also satisfies the boundary conditions of the boundary value problem. In layman's terms, one "shoots" out trajectories in different directions from one boundary until one finds the trajectory that "hits" the other boundary condition.

Mathematical description 
Suppose one wants to solve the boundary-value problemLet  solve the initial-value problemIf , then  is also a solution of the boundary-value problem.

The shooting method is the process of solving the initial value problem for many different values of  until one finds the solution  that satisfies the desired boundary conditions. Typically, one does so numerically. The solution(s) correspond to root(s) of To systematically vary the shooting parameter  and find the root, one can employ standard root-finding algorithms like the bisection method or Newton's method.

Etymology and intuition 
The term "shooting method" has its origin in artillery. An analogy for the shooting method is to

 place a cannon at the position  , then
 vary the angle  of the cannon, then
 fire the cannon until it hits the boundary value .

Between each shot, the direction of the cannon is adjusted based on the previous shot, so every shot hits closer than the previous one. The trajectory that "hits" the desired boundary value is the solution to the boundary value problem — hence the name "shooting method".

Linear shooting method 
The boundary value problem is linear if f has the form

In this case, the solution to the boundary value problem is usually given by:

where  is the solution to the initial value problem:

See the proof for the precise condition under which this result holds.

Examples

Standard boundary value problem 
A boundary value problem is given as follows by Stoer and Bulirsch (Section 7.3.1).

The initial value problem

was solved for s = −1, −2, −3, ..., −100, and F(s) = w(1;s) − 1 plotted in the Figure 2.
Inspecting the plot of F,
we see that there are roots near −8 and −36.
Some trajectories of w(t;s) are shown in the Figure 1.

Stoer and Bulirsch state that there are two solutions,
which can be found by algebraic methods.
These correspond to the initial conditions w′(0) = −8 and w′(0) = −35.9 (approximately).

Eigenvalue problem 

The shooting method can also be used to solve eigenvalue problems. To apply it, first note some general properties of the Schrödinger equation:

 The -th excited state  has  roots where .
 For even , the -th excited state  is symmetric and nonzero at the origin.
 For odd , the -th excited state  is antisymmetric and thus zero at the origin.

To find the -th excited state  and its energy , the shooting method is then to:

 Guess some energy .
 Integrate the Schrödinger equation. For example, use the central finite difference
 If  is even, set  to some arbitrary number (say  — the wavefunction can be normalized after integration anyway) and use the symmetric property to find all remaining .
 If there are more than  roots, the guessed energy is too high, so decrease it and repeat the process.

The energy-guessing can be done with the bisection method, and the process can be terminated when the energy difference is sufficiently small. Then one can take any energy in the interval to be the correct energy.

See also 
 Direct multiple shooting method
 Computation of radiowave attenuation in the atmosphere

Notes

References

External links 
 Brief Description of ODEPACK (at Netlib; contains LSODE)
 Shooting method of solving boundary value problems – Notes, PPT, Maple, Mathcad, Matlab, Mathematica at Holistic Numerical Methods Institute 

Numerical differential equations
Boundary value problems